Ethos generally refers to a culture's guiding ideals.

Ethos may also refer to:
 E-Theses Online Service (EThOS), a service of the British Library
 Environmental and Thermal operating systems (ETHOS) Flight Controller, for the International Space Station
 Ethos, a mode of persuasion which appeals to the authority or honesty of a speaker
 Ethos (film), 2011 documentary film hosted by Woody Harrelson
 Ethos (journal) official journal of the Society for Psychological Anthropology (1973–present)
 Ethos (magazine), a biannual UK magazine (2007–14)
 Ethos (TV series), 2020 Turkish thriller drama web television series
 Ethos Books, an independent Singapore-based publisher
 Ethos Water, a brand of bottled water owned by Starbucks
 EthosCE, a learning system